A periodic function  is a function that repeats its values at regular intervals. For example, the trigonometric functions, which repeat at intervals of  radians, are periodic functions. Periodic functions are used throughout science to describe oscillations, waves, and other phenomena that exhibit periodicity. Any function that is not periodic is called aperiodic.

Definition
A function  is said to be periodic if, for some nonzero constant , it is the case that

A nonzero constant  for which this is the case is called a period of the function. If there exists a least positive constant  with this property, it is called the fundamental period (also primitive period, basic period, or prime period.) Often, "the" period of a function is used to mean its fundamental period. A function with period  will repeat on intervals of length , and these intervals are sometimes also referred to as periods of the function.

This definition of periodicity can be extended to other geometric shapes and patterns, as well as be generalized to higher dimensions, such as periodic tessellations of the plane. A sequence can also be viewed as a function defined on the natural numbers, and for a periodic sequence these notions are defined accordingly.

Examples

Real number examples
The sine function is periodic with period , since

This function repeats on intervals of length  (see the graph to the right).

Everyday examples are seen when the variable is time; for instance the hands of a clock or the phases of the moon show periodic behaviour. Periodic motion is motion in which the position(s) of the system are expressible as periodic functions, all with the same period.

For a function on the real numbers or on the integers, that means that the entire graph can be formed from copies of one particular portion, repeated at regular intervals.

A simple example of a periodic function is the function  that gives the "fractional part" of its argument. Its period is 1. In particular,

 

The graph of the function  is the sawtooth wave.

The trigonometric functions sine and cosine are common periodic functions, with period  (see the figure on the right).  The subject of Fourier series investigates the idea that an 'arbitrary' periodic function is a sum of trigonometric functions with matching periods.

According to the definition above, some exotic functions, for example the Dirichlet function, are also periodic; in the case of Dirichlet function, any nonzero rational number is a period.

Complex number examples
Using complex variables we have the common period function:

Since the cosine and sine functions are both periodic with period , the complex exponential is made up of cosine and sine waves. This means that Euler's formula (above) has the property such that if  is the period of the function, then

Double-periodic functions
A function whose domain is the complex numbers can have two incommensurate periods without being constant. The elliptic functions are such functions. ("Incommensurate" in this context means not real multiples of each other.)

Properties

Periodic functions can take on values many times.

 

For example,  has period  therefore  will have period .

Some periodic functions can be described by Fourier series. For instance, for L2 functions, Carleson's theorem states that they have a pointwise (Lebesgue) almost everywhere convergent Fourier series. Fourier series can only be used for periodic functions, or for functions on a bounded (compact) interval. If  is a periodic function with period  that can be described by a Fourier series, the coefficients of the series can be described by an integral over an interval of length .

Any function that consists only of periodic functions with the same period is also periodic (with period equal or smaller), including:
 addition, subtraction, multiplication and division of periodic functions, and
 taking a power or a root of a periodic function (provided it is defined for all ).

Generalizations

Antiperiodic functions
One subset of periodic functions is that of antiperiodic functions.  This is a function  such that  for all . For example, the sine and cosine functions are -antiperiodic and -periodic. While a -antiperiodic function is a -periodic function, the converse is not necessarily true.

Bloch-periodic functions
A further generalization appears in the context of Bloch's theorems and Floquet theory, which govern the solution of various periodic differential equations.  In this context, the solution (in one dimension) is typically a function of the form

where  is a real or complex number (the Bloch wavevector or Floquet exponent).  Functions of this form are sometimes called Bloch-periodic in this context.   A periodic function is the special case , and an antiperiodic function is the special case . Whenever  is rational,  the function is also periodic.

Quotient spaces as domain
In signal processing you encounter the problem, that Fourier series represent periodic functions and that Fourier series satisfy convolution theorems (i.e. convolution of Fourier series corresponds to multiplication of represented periodic function and vice versa), but periodic functions cannot be convolved with the usual definition, since the involved integrals diverge. A possible way out is to define a periodic function on a bounded but periodic domain. To this end you can use the notion of a quotient space:

.

Thus a function like  is a representation of a 1-periodic function.

Calculating period
Consider a real waveform consisting of superimposed frequencies, expressed in a set as ratios to a fundamental frequency, f: F = [f f f ... f] where all non-zero elements ≥1 and at least one of the elements of the set is 1. To find the period, T, first find the least common denominator of all the elements in the set. Period can be found as T = . Consider that for a simple sinusoid, T = . Therefore, the LCD can be seen as a periodicity multiplier.

 For set representing all notes of Western major scale: [1      ] the LCD is 24 therefore T = .
 For set representing all notes of a major triad: [1  ] the LCD is 4 therefore T = .
 For set representing all notes of a minor triad: [1  ] the LCD is 10 therefore T = .

If no least common denominator exists, for instance if one of the above elements were irrational, then the wave would not be periodic.

See also

References

External links
 
Periodic functions at MathWorld

Calculus
Elementary mathematics
Fourier analysis
Types of functions